Teck Lim Road is a one-way road linking Keong Saik Road to Neil Road in Chinatown within the Outram Planning Area of Singapore. The road is lined with conserved shops and houses a number of budget hotels.

The road is named after Chinese businessman Ong Teck Lim, the son of Ong Kew Ho.

References
Victor R Savage, Brenda S A Yeoh (2004), Toponymics – A Study of Singapore Street Names, Eastern University Press, 

Roads in Singapore
Outram, Singapore
Chinatown, Singapore